Adrijus Glebauskas (born 20 November 1994) is a Lithuanian high jumper.

He finished fifth at the 2017 Summer Universiade, and won the bronze medal at the 2019 Summer Universiade. He also competed at the 2015 European U23 Championships, the 2018 European Championships and the 2019 European Indoor Championships without reaching the final.

His personal best jump is 2.27 metres, achieved in June 2019 in Utena.
He improved it with 2.28 m in Palanga, achieved in July 2019.

References

1994 births
Living people
Lithuanian male high jumpers
European Games competitors for Lithuania
Athletes (track and field) at the 2019 European Games
Medalists at the 2019 Summer Universiade
Athletes (track and field) at the 2020 Summer Olympics
Universiade medalists in athletics (track and field)
Universiade bronze medalists for Lithuania
Olympic athletes of Lithuania